Dianleucauge is a monotypic genus of Chinese long-jawed orb-weavers containing the single species, Dianleucauge deelemanae. It was first described by D. X. Song & M. S. Zhu in 1994, and is found in China.

See also
 List of Tetragnathidae species

References

Monotypic Araneomorphae genera
Spiders of China
Tetragnathidae